Akiva J. Goldsman (born July 7, 1962) is an American filmmaker. He is known for making motion pictures and adaptations of popular novels.

Goldsman's filmography as a screenwriter includes The Client; Batman Forever and its sequel Batman & Robin; I, Robot; I Am Legend; Cinderella Man, and numerous rewrites that are both credited and uncredited. He also wrote more than a dozen episodes for the science fiction television series Fringe.

In 2002, Goldsman received the Oscar for Best Adapted Screenplay and the Golden Globe Award for Best Screenplay for the 2001 film A Beautiful Mind, which also won the Academy Award for Best Picture. In 2006, Goldsman re-teamed with A Beautiful Mind director Ron Howard to adapt Dan Brown's novel The Da Vinci Code for Howard's film. He also wrote the screenplay for its 2009 sequel Angels & Demons.

Goldsman is also known for co-developing the DC Comics TV series Titans and the Paramount Plus series Star Trek: Picard, a sequel to Star Trek: The Next Generation and Star Trek: Nemesis. He is also the co-creator of Star Trek: Strange New Worlds, a prequel to Star Trek: The Original Series.

Early life
Goldsman was born in New York City to Jewish parents and raised in Brooklyn Heights. His parents, Tev Goldsman and Mira Rothenberg, were both clinical child psychologists who ran a group home for emotionally disturbed children. He graduated from Saint Ann's School, also in Brooklyn Heights, where he says he made many friends with whom he later worked in the entertainment industry. He received his bachelor's degree from Wesleyan University and attended the graduate fiction-writing program at New York University.

Career
Goldsman has a production company at Warner Bros. named Weed Road Pictures.

He produced the Universal Pictures feature Lone Survivor, from writer/director Peter Berg, based on the book Lone Survivor: The Eyewitness Account of Operation Redwing and the Lost Heroes of SEAL Team 10 by Marcus Luttrell. It tells the story of Luttrell's Navy SEAL team in 2005 Afghanistan, on a mission to kill a terrorist leader. It starred Mark Wahlberg, Emile Hirsch, Ben Foster and Taylor Kitsch, and was released in 2013.

Goldsman made his feature film directing debut with Winter's Tale, a film adaption of the Mark Helprin novel, starting Colin Farrell, Russell Crowe, Jessica Brown Findlay, Jennifer Connelly, Will Smith and William Hurt. It was released on February 14, 2014. He also directed the horror thriller film Stephanie (2017) with Frank Grillo in the leading role. He co-wrote and produced the film adaptation of Stephen King's The Dark Tower series, released on August 4, 2017, which was one of Goldsman's post-Apotheosis films.

In June 2015, Paramount Pictures announced that Goldsman would head a team of writers and filmmakers to create a multifilm cinematic universe branching out from Hasbro's Transformers franchise. In 2017, his Weed Road company was signed with Paramount.

Goldsman was revealed in September 2018 to have been on the writing staff for Star Trek: Picard, revolving around the later years of the character of Jean-Luc Picard.

In 2020, Goldsman was revealed to be the creator and showrunner of the forthcoming CBS series, Star Trek: Strange New Worlds.

Fringe
In 2008, Goldsman joined the first season crew of the Fox horror/mystery series Fringe as writer, director, and consulting producer. The first episode Goldsman directed and wrote was "Bad Dreams". In its fifth season, Goldsman remained a consulting producer. Episodes he contributed to included:
"Bad Dreams" (01.17)
"The Road Not Taken" (01.19) (executive producer Jeff Pinkner and supervising producer J.R. Orci co-wrote a teleplay based on a story by Goldsman)
"There's More Than One of Everything" (01.20) (co-executive producer J.H. Wyman and Pinkner co-wrote a teleplay based on a story by Goldsman and executive producer Bryan Burk)
"A New Day in the Old Town" (02.01) (co-written by co-creator J. J. Abrams)
"Peter" (02.16) (co-showrunners Jeff Pinkner, J.H. Wyman, and supervising producer Josh Singer co-wrote a teleplay based on a story by Pinkner, Goldsman, Singer, and Wyman)
"Brown Betty" (02.20) (co-written by Wyman and Pinkner)
"Over There (Part 1)" (02.22) (co-written with Pinkner and Wyman)
"Over There (Part 2)" (02.23) (co-written by Pinkner and Wyman)
"Subject 13" (03.15) (co-written with Wyman and Pinkner)
"Stowaway" (03.17) (Danielle Dispaltro wrote a teleplay based on a story Pinkner, Goldsman, and Wyman)
"Lysergic Acid Diethylamide" (03.19) (Wyman and Pinkner co-wrote a teleplay based on a story by Wyman, Goldsman, and Pinkner)
"The Day We Died" (03.22) (Pinkner and Wyman co-wrote a teleplay based on a story Goldsman, Pinkner, and Wyman)
"Neither Here Nor There" (04.01) (Wyman and Pinkner co-wrote a teleplay based on a story Wyman, Goldsman, and Pinkner)
"Subject 9" (04.04) (co-written by Wyman and Pinkner)
"Making Angels" (04.11) (co-written with Wyman and Pinkner)
"Nothing as It Seems" (04.16) (co-written with Pinkner)
"Letters of Transit" (04.19) (co-written by Wyman and Pinkner)
"Brave New World (Part 1)" (04.21) (co-written by Wyman and Pinkner)
"Brave New World (Part 2)" (04.22) (co-written with Wyman and Pinkner)

Personal life
Goldsman's first wife, film producer Rebecca Spikings-Goldsman, died of a heart attack on July 6, 2010, at the age of 42. Rebecca was the daughter of producer Barry Spikings.

In 2012, Akiva met his second wife Joann Richter. The couple were married in 2014 and have two daughters, and divide their time between Los Angeles and New York.

Weed Road Pictures

In 2004, Goldsman founded Weed Road Pictures as an independent production company to produce, develop and finance films and other forms of entertainment properties. Weed Road has financed or cofinanced 13 films. Weed Road recently wrapped production on Firestarter, directed by Keith Thomas and starring Zac Efron, Sydney Lemmon, and Kurtwood Smith. Previous Weed Road releases include Sony's The Dark Tower and Warner Bros. Winter's Tale.

Filmography

Film

Television

Acting credits

Upcoming works
In 2016, it was announced that Goldsman would script an adaptation of Isaac Asimov's The Caves of Steel. Its final release date is still unknown. In July 2017, Paramount Pictures announced plans to make a film adaptation of the novel Rainbow Six by Tom Clancy with Goldsman as producer.

References

Further reading

External links

 

1962 births
Living people
American television writers
American male television writers
American television directors
Best Adapted Screenplay Academy Award winners
American male screenwriters
Best Screenplay Golden Globe winners
Film directors from New York City
Film producers from New York (state)
Jewish American writers
New York University alumni
Screenwriters from New York (state)
Wesleyan University alumni
Writers from New York City
Writers Guild of America Award winners
21st-century American Jews